Cecil Browning (January 29, 1883 – March 23, 1953) was a British rackets player who competed in the 1908 Summer Olympics. He won the silver medal in the men's doubles competition together with Edmund Bury. In the men's singles event he lost his first match.

References

External links
profile

1883 births
1953 deaths
Racquets players
Olympic racquets players of Great Britain
Racquets players at the 1908 Summer Olympics
Olympic silver medallists for Great Britain
Medalists at the 1908 Summer Olympics